IK Sirius is a Swedish bandy club located in Uppsala, currently playing in Elitserien.  IK Sirius were formed in 1907 and play their home games at Studenternas Idrottsplats.

History
IK Sirius' first success was becoming Swedish runners-up in 1918, they followed this up by becoming Swedish champions twice in 1921 and 1922, but they then didn't have any more success in the league until 1926 where they were runners-up and they were also runners-up in 1928.

In the first year of bandy league system in Sweden, 1930–31, Sirius entered in Division 1 Norra together with
AIK, Hammarby IF, IF Vesta, IFK Rättvik, Skutskärs IF, SK Tirfing, and Västerås SK and finished 5th.

In the 1960s the club came back as one of the strongest in the league, finishing second behind Västerås SK in 1960.  They won the title the following year beating Edsbyns IF, but the clubs swapped positions in 1962 with Edsbyns IF taking the crown.  In 1966 IK Sirius BK won the league for a fourth time but lost the title to Örebro SK the following year.  They regained the title for the 5th and currently last time in 1968 beating Örebro SK in the final match.

In 1992 they gained their only World Cup victory beating Sandvikens AIK 7–0 in the final.

In 2008–09 Sirius had their best season in two decades, finishing 3rd in Elitserien and lost to Edsbyns IF in the semi-final off the play-offs.

Current squad

Honours

Domestic
 Swedish Champions:
 Winners (5): 1921, 1922, 1961, 1966, 1968
 Runners-up (5): 1918, 1926, 1928, 1960, 1962

International
 World Cup:
 Winners (1): 1992
 Runners-up (1): 1977

References

External links
Official website
 ibdb bandysidan

 
Bandy clubs in Sweden
Sport in Uppsala
Sport in Uppsala County
Bandy clubs established in 1907
1907 establishments in Sweden

de:IK Sirius